Tătaru is a commune in Prahova County, Muntenia, Romania. It is composed of three villages: Podgoria, Siliștea and Tătaru.

References

Communes in Prahova County
Localities in Muntenia